The Weekly with Charlie Pickering is an Australian news satire series on the ABC. The series premiered on 22 April 2015, featuring Charlie Pickering as host with Tom Gleeson, Adam Briggs and Judith Lucy in the cast who joined the show in 2019, replacing Kitty Flanagan.

On 18 September 2015, the series was renewed for a second season, which premiered on 3 February 2016. On 2 November 2016, the series was renewed for a third season, which premiered on 1 February 2017. The fourth season premiered on 2 May 2018 at the later time slot of 9:05pm to make room for the series return of Gruen at 8:30pm, and was signed on for 20 episodes.

In addition to the series renewal in September 2015, a one-off special titled The Yearly was commissioned, which premiered on 16 December 2015. A second Yearly special aired the following year, premiering on 14 December 2016.

On the final episode of season 4 of the series, Kitty Flanagan announced that she would be leaving the show. Flanagan made one final appearance on The Yearly with Charlie Pickering. In 2019, the series was renewed for a fifth season with Judith Lucy announced as a new addition to the cast as a "wellness expert". In 2020, the show was filmed without a live audience due to coronavirus pandemic restrictions and comedian Luke McGregor joined the show as a regular contributor.
Judith Lucy did not return in 2021 and Zoë Coombs Marr joined as a new cast member in season 7 with the running joke that she was fired from the show in episode one yet she kept returning to work for the show.

Format 
The show starts with a cold open which consists of a short introduction to the guests and main stories coming up. The program's format has been compared to Last Week Tonight with John Oliver, following a similar structure. Charlie Pickering delivers a selection of the past week's news stories interspersed with jokes. Similarly to The Daily Show, most episodes feature a cross to a specialised correspondent (including Adam Briggs, Loyiso Gola, Jonathan Pie, Tiff Stevenson, and Wyatt Cenac), and/or an interview with a guest. A previously prepared sketch, story or interview is usually presented by Tom Gleeson and Judith Lucy. The show was pre-recorded in front of an audience in ABC's Ripponlea studio on the same day of its airing from 2015 to 2017. In 2018, the fourth series episodes were pre-recorded in front of an audience at the ABC Southbank Centre studios.
Gleeson's interview segment Hard Chat is inspired by Between Two Ferns with Zach Galifianakis, and was later spun off into a quiz show entitled Hard Quiz. This segment, as of 2020, has evolved with new titling and a new format. This segment is now called Yard Chat. This was due to the pandemic which forced Tom Gleeson to work from home and do the chat 'in his yard'.

Episodes

The Yearly with Charlie Pickering

The Yearly with Charlie Pickering is an annual special which relives the year's highlights and lowlights. It concludes with The Weekly's Person of the Year. The first show screened on 16 December 2015.

Awards and nominations

References

External links 
 

Australian Broadcasting Corporation original programming
2015 Australian television series debuts
English-language television shows
2010s Australian comedy television series
2020s Australian comedy television series
2010s satirical television series
2020s satirical television series
Australian satirical television shows